Kråkvåg is a populated group of islands in the municipality of Ørland in Trøndelag county, Norway. It is located in the Kråkvågfjorden, just west of the island of Storfosna. The island is home to agriculture and fish processing.

The  island of Kråkvåg is connected to the nearby island of Storfosna by a  causeway with a  bridge in the middle of it.  Kråkvåg is the main island of the group, and it is closely surrounded by the islands of  Kommersøya, Litjslåttøya, and Storslåttøya.  All of the islands are connected by bridges and causeways.

See also
List of islands of Norway

References

Islands of Trøndelag
Villages in Trøndelag
Ørland